Wilhelm (Vilho) Bernhard Lehokas (24 April 1876 in Messukylä – May 1918 in Viipuri; original surname Löfqvist) was a Finnish upholsterer and politician. He was a member of the Parliament of Finland from 1916 to 1918. During the Finnish Civil War, he sided with the Reds, was made prisoner by White troops and shot in Viipuri in May 1918.

References

1876 births
1918 deaths
Politicians from Tampere
People from Häme Province (Grand Duchy of Finland)
Social Democratic Party of Finland politicians
Members of the Parliament of Finland (1916–17)
Members of the Parliament of Finland (1917–19)
People of the Finnish Civil War (Red side)
People executed by Finland by firing squad